The Women's 400m athletics events for the 2020 Summer Paralympics took place at the Tokyo National Stadium from August 27 to September 4, 2021. A total of 9 events were contested over this distance.

Schedule

Medal summary
The following is a summary of the medals awarded across all 400 metres events.

Results
The following were the results of the finals only of each of the Women's 400 metres events in each of the classifications. Further details of each event, including where appropriate heats and semi finals results, are available on that event's dedicated page.

T11

The final in this classification took place on 28 August 2021, at 11:45:

T12

The final in this classification took place on 31 August 2021, at 11:36:

T13

The final in this classification took place on 4 September 2021, at 10:08:

T20

The final in this classification took place on 31 August 2021, at 20:38:

T37

The final in this classification took place on 31 August 2021, at 21:45:

T38

The final in this classification took place on 4 September 2021, at 20:38:

T47

The final in this classification took place on 28 August 2021, at 21:07:

T53

The final in this classification took place on 2 September, at 19:30:

T54

The final in this classification took place on 2 September, at 19:40:

References

Athletics at the 2020 Summer Paralympics
2021 in women's athletics